is a retired long-distance runner from Japan. She represented her native country in the women's marathon at the 1988 Summer Olympics in Seoul, South Korea. She won the silver medal in the women's 10.000 metres at the 1986 Asian Games in Seoul, South Korea.

International competitions

References
 

1965 births
Living people
Japanese female long-distance runners
Japanese female cross country runners
Japanese female marathon runners
Olympic athletes of Japan
Olympic female marathon runners
Athletes (track and field) at the 1988 Summer Olympics
Asian Games silver medalists for Japan
Asian Games medalists in athletics (track and field)
Athletes (track and field) at the 1986 Asian Games
Athletes (track and field) at the 1990 Asian Games
World Athletics Championships athletes for Japan
Medalists at the 1986 Asian Games
Medalists at the 1990 Asian Games
20th-century Japanese women
21st-century Japanese women